Audrey Sauret (born 31 October 1976 in Charleville-Mézières) is a French basketball player currently playing for Union Lyon BF. She has played the Euroleague with Valenciennes Olympic, Bourges Basket, UMMC Ekaterinburg and Cras Basket Taranto. She also played in the WNBA for Washington Mystics.

She was a member of the French national team between 1994 and 2007, winning the 2001 Eurobasket. and was the team's captain in the 2006 World Championship.

Club career
  Valenciennes Olympic (1993–98, 2000–05), Bourges (1998–2000), Union Lyon (2011– )
  Washington Mystics (2001–02)
  Ekaterinburg (2005–07)
  Cras Taranto (2007–09), Schio (2009–10), Parma (2010–11)

References

1976 births
Living people
Basketball players at the 2000 Summer Olympics
French expatriate basketball people in Italy
French expatriate basketball people in Russia
French expatriate basketball people in the United States
French women's basketball players
Olympic basketball players of France
People from Charleville-Mézières
Sportspeople from Ardennes (department)
Washington Mystics players